First Family is a 1980 American comedy film written and directed by comedian and actor Buck Henry, and starring Bob Newhart, Madeline Kahn, Gilda Radner, Harvey Korman, Rip Torn, Austin Pendleton, Fred Willard and Richard Benjamin. It received negative reviews.

Plot 
Manfred Link is the president of the United States. He and the usually tipsy First Lady have a 28-year-old, sex-starved daughter named Gloria. The president is surrounded by a number of eccentric staffers and allies, including Vice President Shockley, Ambassador Spender, Press Secretary Bunthorne and a presidential aide named Feebleman. He also is advised by General Dumpston, chairman of the Joint Chiefs of Staff.

The administration needs the support of the (fictional) African nation of Upper Gorm for an upcoming vote and must deal with Longo, that country's United Nations ambassador. Unfortunately, it can find only one American who knows how to speak the Upper Gormese language, a man named Alexander Grade. As best they can understand it, the ruler of Upper Gorm wants, in exchange, a number of Americans sent to his land so that his country, like the United States, can know what it's like to have an oppressed minority. Gloria is kidnapped and Americans are transported to Africa like slaves.

Cast
Bob Newhart as President Manfred Link
Madeline Kahn as Constance Link
Gilda Radner as Gloria Link
Richard Benjamin as Press Secretary Bunthorne
Bob Dishy as Vice President Shockley
Harvey Korman as Ambassador Spender
Fred Willard as Chief of Staff Feebleman
Rip Torn as General Dumpston
Austin Pendleton as Dr. Alexander Grade
John Hancock as President Mazai Kalundra
Julius Harris as Ambassador Longo

Reception
Critical reception to First Family was hostile, generally considering it unfunny. Some writers were especially unimpressed given the strong cast, all of whom were established comedians and comic actors as not having much to work with. Buck Henry had written other successful TV shows and films such as Saturday Night Live and The Graduate, but critics uniformly felt gave the actors largely inferior material in First Family which he also directed.  Richard Corliss of Time magazine wrote that "Henry began with a funny situation but no plot" and that "Any episode of M*A*S*H, Taxi or The Muppet Show has more laughs and pathos per minute than this impeachable farce."  People magazine wrote that the screenplay "disintegrates about halfway through the film."  Vincent Canby of The New York Times offered a more positive review than other critics, praising the cast and saying that some of the sequences were hilarious.  Canby did agree that the film's second half somewhat ran out of ideas, though.

The film grossed $15 million at the box office.

Actor John Hillerman was up for a role in the film and "wanted the part very badly", and had he gotten the role, he would have turned down the role of Higgins in Magnum, P.I.

References

External links

1980 films
1980 comedy films
1980s English-language films
1980s political comedy films
1980s satirical films
American political comedy films
American political satire films
Films about fictional presidents of the United States
Films about the United States Secret Service
Films directed by Buck Henry
Films set in Washington, D.C.
Films with screenplays by Buck Henry
Warner Bros. films
1980s American films